WRTN-LD, virtual channel 6 (VHF digital channel 26), is a low-powered
television station that serves Nashville, Tennessee and is based in Lebanon and licensed to Alexandria. The station is owned by Richard and Lisa Goetz.

History
The station signed on in January 2007 under the call sign of WKRP-LP, the call sign that was made famous in the American sitcoms WKRP in Cincinnati and The New WKRP in Cincinnati, which portray a fictional radio station with that call sign. It was affiliated with White Springs Television until September 2008 when it switched to the Retro Television Network. The low power digital channel 7 started broadcasting on June 12, 2009. On April 27, 2009, the call letters of the digital channel were changed to WRTN-LD, but the call letters of the analog channel remained listed as WKRP-LP until 2010, despite the callsign being reassigned to WKRP-LP (now Key West sister station WKWT-LP).

The station also added several additional subchannels with additional programming. The Retro Television Network affiliation was moved to the second digital subchannel, as religious programming from Daystar was added to the main subchannel. A third subchannel was added in 2009 showing country music videos, however the country music videos would be dropped in 2012, in favor of Cozi TV. The Cozi TV affiliation then moved to WSMV-TV's third subchannel of 4.3, resulting in WRTN discontinuing Cozi TV from their third subchannel a day before WSMV added Cozi TV to their third subchannel (on May 28, 2015). WRTN-LD's third subchannel was now occupied by Retro TV, which moved from the second subchannel. The second subchannel became automotive-themed network Rev'n. Retro TV then moved to the station's fifth subchannel, (replacing Tuff TV) to make way for Antenna TV, as that network debuted on the station's third subchannel on the weekend of September 11, 2015. On September 21, 2015, This TV (which was previously seen on WTVF's third subchannel) moved to WRTN's second subchannel of 6.2, replacing Rev'n, as WTVF replaced This TV with the new comedy oriented Network Laff. On Tuesday September 22, Antenna TV & This TV swapped channel positions with Antenna TV moving to Channel 6.2 & This TV moving to Channel 6.3. On September 30, 2015, Rev'n was readded to 6.2, with Antenna TV moving back to 6.3, and This TV moving to 6.6, replacing the localized classic movies channel that was run by WRTN.

On December 31, 2015, This TV moved from channel 6.6 to channel 6.3, replacing Antenna TV, which moved to WZTV's third digital subchannel of 17.3. Tuff TV was readded once again to channel 6.6 on the same day.

On June 21, 2016, WRTN replaced the infomercials running 24 hours a day on Channel 6.7 with Ebru TV, however six months later, on December 9, 2016, Ebru TV was replaced with a local channel, which originates from WRTN, running classic Western movies and TV shows 24 hours a day on Channel 6.7. Also on that day, WRTN discontinued Rev'n on Channel 6.2 & replaced that channel with Jewelry Television, therefore returning that infomercial marketer to Nashville after WJFB stopped airing it to move the full-time America One affiliate to its main channel in HD, now a simulcast of WJFB 44.1. WJFB's America One affiliation remained on that channel until 2015 when it became affiliated with the Tri-State Christian Television network. In January, 2017, WRTN-LD6 was replaced with Evine. In June 2017, WRTN subchannels were swapped.

On December 3, 2019, This TV was discontinued from channel 6.3, while Jewelry Television was discontinued from channel 6.7, leaving both channels temporarily vacant. This TV would make its return once again to 6.3 on December 10, 2019.

Spectrum incentive auction results
The station has a construction permit to move its digital operations to UHF 17, and is in the process of doing so, as a result of the FCC Spectrum Auction. The station went off the air on July 3, 2020 at 9:00 a.m. CDT to work on their transmitter and temporarily broadcast on VHF Channel 8.

WRTN-LD renewed its station license on April 22, 2021.

WRTN-LD returned to the air on Monday, April 25, 2022, carrying some of the same subchannels as it did, before it went off the air for channel relocating. WRTN-LD was in a channel sharing agreement with Daystar Owned-and-operated station WNTU-LD (On UHF channel 26) and is still also carrying and sharing the Daystar affiliation, until WRTN moved to its new digital channel location of channel 17 on May 11, 2022.

The station's analog license was cancelled by the FCC on April 28, 2021.

Digital television

Digital channels

Former affiliations

References

External links

RTN-LP
Television channels and stations established in 2007
2007 establishments in Tennessee